Phrynobatrachus dalcqi is a species of frogs in the family Phrynobatrachidae. It is endemic to the eastern Democratic Republic of the Congo and only known from Fizi Territory in the South Kivu province. The specific name dalcqi honours "Professor A. Dalcq", presumably Albert Dalcq (1893–1973), a Belgian embryologist. Common names Kivu river frog and Dalcq's puddle frog have been proposed for it.

Description
The body is compact and the head is short, with a pointed snout. The fingers and the toes bear terminal discs. The toes have distinct basal webbing. Skin is dorsally warty, more so in males than in females. There is a pair of long ridges in the scapular area as well as a medial horseshoe-shaped dorsal ridge. Dorsal colouration is grey-brown with indistinct darker patterning. A light vertebral stripe may be present. The legs have dark crossbars. The venter is pale grey with darker grey stippling (more prominent in females). A clear median line runs through the throat to the pectoral region.

Habitat and conservation
Ecology of Phrynobatrachus dalcqi is poorly known. Threats to it are unknown. It is not known to occur in any protected areas.

References

dalcqi
Frogs of Africa
Amphibians of the Democratic Republic of the Congo
Endemic fauna of the Democratic Republic of the Congo
Taxa named by Raymond Laurent
Amphibians described in 1952
Taxonomy articles created by Polbot